The Fittipaldi F5 was a Formula One car for the 1977 Formula One season. It was driven by Brazilian Emerson Fittipaldi. The engine was a Ford Cosworth DFV, with the car achieving three of the team's 11 points from the season. The car was modified to become the F5A, which was used for the  season and part of the  season. Fittipaldi was the sole driver of the car in all three seasons. The car was succeeded by the Fittipaldi F6A.

After Formula One, F5 cars continued to be used in the Aurora F1 Championship in 1978, 1979, and 1980 and later in historic racing.

Formula One World Championship results
(key)

 Points also scored by the FD04 chassis.

References

1977 Formula One season cars
1978 Formula One season cars
1979 Formula One season cars
Fittipaldi Formula One cars